Dowon Gymnasium is an indoor arena facility located in Incheon, South Korea, which has hosted various international sports competitions. It was the venue for judo and wrestling competitions of 2014 Asian Games. It is the home stadium of the Incheon Korean Air Jumbos.

References

Sports venues in Incheon
Indoor arenas in South Korea
Buildings and structures in Incheon
Venues of the 2014 Asian Games
Asian Games judo venues